René Daniëls (sometimes written as René Daniels) (born 23 May 1950 in Eindhoven) is a Dutch artist.

Daniels is considered one of the most eminent Dutch painters of his generation. In his work he links art and its rich history to literature and everyday life, following in the footsteps of, amongst others, Marcel Duchamp and René Magritte. Ambiguity and double meanings play an important role in what he calls "visual poetry".

He has exhibited regularly at home and abroad, until in 1987 at the age of 37, he was affected by a brain haemorrhage. All materials in his studio were housed in the Stichting René Daniëls and documented and preserved by the Van Abbemuseum. Since 2006, Daniels lives in his native city of Eindhoven and began to paint and draw again.

Biography

Education 
 1972–1976 Koninklijke Akademie voor Kunst en Vormgeving, ’s-Hertogenbosch

Lectureships 
 1980 AKI, Enschede
 1982–1986 Academie voor Beeldende Vorming, Tilburg
 1983–1987 Ateliers '63, Haarlem
 1987 Jan van Eyck Academie, Maastricht

Prizes 
 1988 Sandbergprijs voor Schilderkunst
 1998 Commissarispenning, Provincie Noord-Brabant 1992 David Roëll Prijs
 2007 Oeuvreprijs Fonds BKVB

Exhibitions

Solo and duo exhibitions 
 1977 Hans Biezen/René Daniëls. Fotos und Zeichnungen, Stadt-Sparkasse, Düsseldorf.
 1978 René Daniëls schilderijen, Joop Stolk grafiek, Galerie Helen van der Meij, Amsterdam.
 1978 René Daniëls. Schilderijen, gouaches en tekeningen, Stedelijk Van Abbemuseum, Eindhoven.
 1979 René Daniëls. Schilderijen en aquarellen, Galerie Helen van der Meij, Amsterdam
 1981 Werk van René Daniëls en werk van Lili Dujouri, Vereniging Aktuele Kunst: Gewad, Ghent
 1982 René Daniëls, John van ’t Slot''', '121' Art Gallery, Antwerp
 1982 René Daniëls. ’Nieuw werk, Galerie Helen van der Meij, Amsterdam
 1983 René Daniëls. Schilderijen, Galerie Helen van der Meij/Paul Andriesse, Amsterdam
 1983 Daniëls/Dieleman. Tekeningen, Stedelijk Museum Amsterdam
 1984 Een zaal boven de Pacific, Kunstcentrum Marktzeventien, Enschede
 1984 René Daniëls. Schilderijen, Galerie Paul Andriesse, Amsterdam
 1984 Meanwhile, Metro Pictures, New York
 1985 Acht schilderijen over ondergronds verzet, Galerie Paul Andriesse, Amsterdam
 1985 Innodiging voor Mooie Tentoonstellingen/Trio Eenzaamheid, Galerie Paul Andriesse, Amsterdam
 1985 René Daniëls, Metro Pictures, New York
 1986 René Daniëls, Galerie Joost Declerq, Ghent
 1986 René Daniëls, Produzentengalerie, Hamburg
 1986 René Daniëls. Schilderijen en tekeningen 1976–1986, Stedelijk Van Abbemuseum, Eindhoven
 1987 René Daniëls. Kades-Kaden, Kunsthalle Bern
 1987 René Daniëls. A’dam E’ven, Galerie Paul Andriesse, Amsterdam
 1987 René Daniëls, Galerie Rudolf Zwirner, Keulen
 1990 René Daniëls. Lentebloesem, Maison de la culture et de la communication, Saint-Etienne; Museum Boymans-van Beuningen, Rotterdam
 1992 Kleine presentatie René Daniëls, Stedelijk Van Abbemuseum, Eindhoven
 1993 René Daniëls, The Arts Club of Chicago, Chicago
 1993 René Daniëls, Raum Aktueller Kunst, Wenen
 1993 De Aankoop I. René Daniëls, Bonnefantenmuseum, Maastricht
 1993 René Daniëls/Shirley Wiitasalo, Art Gallery of York University, Toronto, Ontario; Illingworth Kerr Gallery, Alberta College of Art, Calgary, Alberta; Mackenzie Art Gallery, Regina, Saskatchewan
 1994 René Daniëls, Institut Néerlandais, Paris
 1994 René Daniëls/Shirley Wiitasalo, Museum Haus Lange, Krefeld
 1995 René Daniëls, Stedelijk Van Abbemuseum, Eindhoven
 1998 René Daniëls. The Most Contemporary Picture Show, Stedelijk Van Abbemuseum, Eindhoven; Kunstmuseum Wolfsburg, Wolfsburg; Kunsthalle Basel, Basel
 1999 René Daniëls, Stedelijk Museum Amsterdam
 1999 René Daniëls. The Most Contemporary Picture Show, Museu Serralves – Museu de Arte Contemporânea, Porto
 2000 René Daniëls: Paintings and Drawings, 22 April 2000 – 3 June 2000, Metro Pictures, New York. The show features works from the late 1970s through the 1980s which are on loan from the René Daniëls Foundation and various European museums.
 2004 Nederland Niet Nederland, Van Abbemuseum, Eindhoven
 2006 René Daniëls, Domaine de Kerguéhennec – Centre d’Art Contemporain, Bignan
 2006 René Daniëls, Bonnefantenmuseum, Maastricht
 2007 René Daniëls. Tekeningen en schilderijen 1977–1987, Stichting De Pont, Tilburg
 2010 René Daniëls: Paintings on Unknown Languages, 23 September 2010 – 28 November 2010, Camden Arts Centre, London. This exhibition brings together a significant number of paintings and drawings by the Dutch artist René Daniëls, focusing on his work between 1980 and 1987.
 2011-2012 René Daniëls. An exhibition is always part of a greater whole, Palacio de Velázquez, Parque del Retiro, October 20, 2011 – March 26, 2012. Organized by Museo Reina Sofía and Van Abbemuseum Eindhoven. The show presents a broad selection of works dated from the 1970s to 1987: paintings, graphics, some of his earliest pieces, characterised by their expressionist brushstrokes, and the arboreal cartographies and diagrams of his Lentebloesem series. Furthermore, the exhibition also includes various materials and documents (notebooks, sketches, annotations from the artist's archives.
 2012 René Daniëls – Een tentoonstelling is ook altijd een deel van een groter geheel, 12 May 2012 – 23 September 2012, Van Abbemuseum Eindhoven. Organized by Museo Reina Sofía and Van Abbemuseum Eindhoven (see below).
 2018 René Daniëls: Fragmenten uit een onvoltooide roman, 7 September 2018 – 6 January 2019, Wiels Brussels. Organized by Wiels and MAMCO, Genève.

 Collections 
 Van Abbemuseum in Eindhoven (overview of works)
 De Pont Museum of Contemporary Art in Tilburg (overview of works)
 Bonnefantenmuseum in Maastricht 
 Kunstmuseum Wolfsburg in Wolfsburg
 Tate Gallery in London
 Gemeentemuseum Helmond (overview of works)

 Descriptions of individual works 

 Paintings Mexikaan (Mexican, 1977) Bilske, Maria and Sanger, Alice (May 2006 / October 2008). Mexican. Tate, London.

 Hollandse Nieuwe (New Dutch Herring, 1982) 
 Bilske, Maria and Sanger, Alice (May 2006 / October 2008). New Dutch Herring. Tate, London.Terugkeer van de performance (Return of the performance, 1987)' René Daniëls. Return of the performance. Description accompanying the small exhibition Plug In #31, Van Abbemuseum, Eindhoven.

 References 

 Catalogues 
 René Daniels: schilderijen en tekeningen 1976–1986. Stedelijk Van Abbemuseum Eindhoven, 1986 (64 pages, Dutch). Foreword by Jan Debbaut.
 René Daniëls: Kades-Kaden. Kunsthalle Bern, 15.August bis 20.September 1987 (German). Foreword by Ulrich Loock.
 René Daniëls. Stedelijk Van Abbemuseum Eindhoven, Kunstmuseum Wolfsburg, Kunsthalle Basel, 1998 (187 pages, editions in English, German and Dutch). Contains a comprehensive list of exhibitions, publications and works. Foreword by Jan Debbaut. Articles by Jaap Bremer, Philip Peters, Paul Andriesse, Ulrich Loock, Dirk van Weelden, Bert Jansen, Annelie Lütgens.

 Journal articles 
 Simon, Robert (1999). Rene Daniels. Artforum International Magazine, 1999.
 Smedt, Erik de (2007). Beelden uit een tentoonstelling: René Daniëls, 'Lentebloesem'. De Leeswolf, October 2007 / Ooteoote, February 2018 (Dutch).
 Smedt, Erik de (2007). De speelruimte van de geest: over René Daniëls. De Leeswolf, October 2007 (Dutch).
 Velde, Dries van de (2010). René Daniëls: Painting on Unknown Languages. De Witte Raaf, edition 148, November–December 2010 (Dutch).
 Herbert, Martin (2011). Rene Daniëls, Camden Arts Centre, London. Frieze, Issue 136, January – February 2011.
 Boogerd, Dominic van den (2012). Avenue des Mémoires: René Daniëls and the art of memory''. Metropolis M, Vol.2, 2012, pp. 108–110.

Reference websites 
 René Daniëls in WorldCat Identities

External links 
 Facebook page about René Daniëls
 Memoires van een vergeetal: Leven en werk van René Daniëls, website (Dutch) accompanying a television documentary bearing the same title (2012).

1950 births
Living people
Dutch contemporary artists
Dutch painters
Dutch male painters
Modern painters
People from Eindhoven